Alucita kazachstanica is a moth of the family Alucitidae that is endemic to Kazakhstan.

References

Moths described in 2003
Endemic fauna of Kazakhstan
Alucitidae
Moths of Asia